Aimé Mabika (born 16 August 1998) is a Zambian professional footballer who plays as a defender for Major League Soccer club Inter Miami and the Zambia national team.

Career

College and amateur
Mabika attended the University of Kentucky in 2016 to play college soccer. He redshirted his freshman season, before going on to play four seasons between 2017 and 2020, making 62 appearances for the Wildcats, scoring 10 goals and tallying two assists. Mabika also earned C-USA All-Freshman Team honors in 2017, United Soccer Coaches All-Southeast Region first team and All-C-USA first team honors in 2018, and was named Named C-USA Player of the Year, C-USA Co-Defensive MVP and All-C-USA first team honors in 2019.

In 2018, Mabika also made seven appearances for USL PDL side Cincinnati Dutch Lions.

Professional
On 21 January 2021, Mabika was selected 26th overall in the 2021 MLS SuperDraft by Inter Miami. On 2 May, Mabika signed for Miami's USL League One affiliate side Fort Lauderdale CF, and made his professional debut the same day in a 2–1 win over Richmond Kickers.

On 9 October, Mabika was promoted to the Inter Miami squad and made his Major League Soccer debut in a 1–0 loss to New York Red Bulls.

On 13 January 2022, Mabika signed permanently with the Inter Miami first team.

International career
Mabika debuted for the Zambia national team in a friendly 3–1 win over the Congo on 25 March 2022.

Personal life
Mabika was born in Zambia to Congolese parents. His parents moved him and his family to Lexington, Kentucky, in the United States when he was 8 years old.

References

External links 
 Aimé Mabika - Men's Soccer at University of Kentucky Athletics
 Aimé Mabika | MLSsoccer.com MLS profile

1998 births
Living people
Zambian footballers
Zambia international footballers
Zambian people of Democratic Republic of the Congo descent
Association football defenders
Cincinnati Dutch Lions players
Inter Miami CF II players
Inter Miami CF players
Inter Miami CF draft picks
Kentucky Wildcats men's soccer players
USL League One players
Major League Soccer players
Zambian expatriate footballers
Zambian expatriate sportspeople in the United States
Expatriate soccer players in the United States
MLS Next Pro players